André Neury (3 September 1921 – 16 October 2007) was a Swiss football defender who played for Switzerland in the 1950 and 1954 FIFA World Cup. He also played for FC La Chaux-de-Fonds, FC Locarno, and Servette FC.

References

External links
FIFA profile

1921 births
2007 deaths
Swiss men's footballers
Switzerland international footballers
Association football defenders
FC La Chaux-de-Fonds players
FC Locarno players
Servette FC players
1950 FIFA World Cup players
1954 FIFA World Cup players
Swiss Super League players
Footballers from Geneva